The accordion is in a wide variety of musical genres, mainly in traditional and popular music.   In some regions, such as Europe and North America, it has become mainly restricted to traditional, folk and ethnic music.  In other regions such as Mexico, the instrument is very popular in genres like Norteño, and in Brazil, it is a fixture in popular music styles as Sertanejo and Forró.

In art music it is used in jazz music, an important exponent having been the North American accordionist Frank Marocco and in transcriptions from the operatic and light-classical music repertoire.

Use in traditional music 

After the invention of the accordion in 1829, its popularity spread throughout the world, in no small measure due to the polka craze. "Once the polka became a craze in Paris and London during the spring of 1844, it diffused rapidly to the rest of the world. . . . In March 1844, polka-mania took Paris: common people, servants, workers and, one assumes, anyone else who wasn't too stuffy were dancing the polka in the streets of the capital and soon in Bordeaux and other French cities as well. A week or so later it took London by storm. And from these two great centers of fashion, empire, and influence, the polka diffused rapidly upward into the rest of French and English society and outward to the rest of the world."

Except for a brief moment in time during the 1830s and 1840s when the accordion was heard by French aristocracy during Salon music concerts, the instrument has always been associated with the common people. The accordion was spread across the globe by the waves of Europeans who emigrated to various parts of the world in the late 19th century and early 20th century.

The mid-19th-century accordion became a favorite of folk musicians for several reasons: "The new instrument's popularity [among the common masses] was a result of its unique qualities. Firstly, it was much louder than all the older folk instruments put together. It could easily be heard in even the wildest pub above the stomping of dancing feet. It was also the prototype of a 'one man band' with bass and chords on the left-hand side and buttons for the melody on the right, and you could still sing along and beat the rhythm with your feet. The instrument needed no tuning and was always ready to play, but the most ingenious thing about the early one-row squeezebox was that you couldn't play it really badly. Even if you lost the melody it still sounded fine."

Since its invention, the accordion has become popularly integrated into a lot of varying traditional music styles all over the world, ranging from the European polka and the Colombian Vallenato to Korean trot music. See the list of traditional music styles that incorporate the accordion. Although rarely seen, many early bigband (swing bands like Glenn Miller's) scores have the Piano part marked "Piano/Piano Accordion"

Sometimes, certain traditional music styles may even be tied to a certain type of accordion, like the Schrammel accordion for Schrammelmusik, the Trikitixa for Basque music, or the diatonic button accordion in Mexican conjunto and norteño music. It would be hard to name one country in which the accordion did not play a significant role in its music tradition. It has even been idealized in literature.

Use in popular music 

The accordion was heard frequently in popular music beginning around 1910 until about 1960. With rise of the popularity of the guitar (in particular the electric guitar) and rock music, the popularity of the accordion in pop music in Europe and North-America declined strongly. In some countries however, such as Brazil and Mexico, the accordion continues to be a fixture in pop music and its popularity is undiminished.

This half century is often called the "Golden Age of the Accordion." Three players, more than any others, inaugurated this era of popularity for the instrument, all Italian immigrants to the United States: Pietro Frosini, and the two brothers Count Guido Deiro and Pietro Deiro. All three players were celebrities on the Vaudeville circuits and performed throughout North America, Europe and Australia during the age of Vaudeville. They recorded hundreds of 78 RPM records for the Victor Talking Machine Company, Columbia Records, Decca Records, Edison Records and Cylinders, and other labels. Guido Deiro was the most successful and famous accordionist during the 1910s and 1920s, and lived a life filled with celebrity, luxury, fast cars, and fast women. Many popular bands, such as the Paul Whiteman Orchestra, employed staff accordionists.

After most Vaudeville theaters closed during the Great Depression, accordionists still found work during the 1930s teaching and performing for radio. Charles Magnante is considered one of the greatest American popular accordionists. At the peak of his career, he played 30 live radio broadcasts and eight studio sessions each week. Another great popular American accordionist was Dick Contino, who toured with the Horace Heidt Orchestra and was billed as the "world's greatest accordion player." He appeared on The Ed Sullivan Show a record 48 times. In addition, John Serry, Sr. achieved national recognition on tour with Shep Fields and His Rippling Rhythm jazz orchestra during the 1930s, concertized on the CBS radio and television networks in the 1940s and
1950s and appeared in the Broadway Theatre during the 1950s and 1960s.

During the 1950s through the 1980s the accordion received great exposure on television with performances by Myron Floren—the accordionist with Lawrence Welk—on the Lawrence Welk Show. However, with the advent of rock 'n roll and the generation gap in the late 1950s and early 1960s, the accordion declined in popularity, as the younger generation considered it "square"— epitomizing the light-hearted music of their parents and grandparents.

In European and North American (outside of Mexico), in contemporary mainstream pop music (see youth culture), the use of the accordion is usually considered exotic or old-fashioned. Nevertheless, some popular acts do use the instrument in their distinctive sounds, and a 2014 Los Angeles Times article reports that the instrument is growing in popularity locally. (See the list of popular music acts that incorporate the accordion.)
Since the late 19th century, Tejano music has emerged as one of the leading genres for the instrument in America. Pioneers such as Narciso Martínez gave the instrument staple in the cultural music of Mexican American people. Central to the evolution of early Tejano music was the blend of traditional forms such as the Corrido and Mariachi, and Continental European styles, such as Polka, introduced by German and Czech settlers in the late 19th century. In particular, the accordion was adopted by Tejano folk musicians at the turn of the 20th century, and it became a popular instrument for amateur musicians in Texas and Northern Mexico.

The accordion has been a primary instrument in Mexican music. It is mostly associated with Norteño music, which has become one of the most popular music genres in Mexico since the 1990s, but the instrument is also featured in other genres such as Cumbia. Ramon Ayala is arguably the best-known accordion player in Mexico; nicknamed the "King of the accordion", Ayala has recorded over 113 albums since the 1960s.

Additionally, the accordion became a fixture in merengue music, a genre that is representative of the Dominican Republic.

In some countries, such as Brazil, the accordion is a fixture in mainstream popular music (evidenced by mainstream groups such as Falamansa, Michel Teló, Avioes do Forró). The instrument is commonly learned by teenagers and enjoys a popularity comparable to the guitar. In some regions (such as the North-East, where it is called sanfona), the accordion surpasses the guitar in popularity among the youth. In Brazil, however, the accordion uses normally a very dry tuning, which dissociates it from the wetter sound found in European folk music.

The instrument was also used in the Disney song "Whale of a Tale" from 20,000 Leagues Under the Sea, as well as Donald Duck's song, "Quack Quack Quack". It was used in a Christmas setting for the song "Nuttin' for Christmas".

The composer Tomohito Nishiura frequently uses the accordion in the Professor Layton series of games, for example in "Laboratory" or "Don Paolo's Theme". However, when 'Live Versions' of the soundtracks are released, the accordion is occasionally replaced (such as in "London 3" from Professor Layton and the Unwound Future). Every 'theme' for a game uses the accordion in some capacity.

It is a traditional instrument in Brazilian music, specifically baião of the northeast. Luiz Gonzaga is called the king of baião.

Various folk metal and viking metal bands, such as Finsterforst, Finntroll, and Turisas that have formed in the 1990s and first decade of the 21st century feature accordions.

Use in classical music 

Although the accordion is best known primarily as a folk instrument, it has been used with increasing frequency by classical composers.

The Russian composer Piotr Ilyitch Tchaikovsky included four optional single-action diatonic accordions in his Orchestral Suite No. 2 in C Major, op. 53 (1883), simply to add a little color to the third movement: Scherzo burlesque.

The Italian composer Umberto Giordano included the single-action diatonic accordion in his opera Fedora (1898). The accordionist appears on-stage—along with a folk-trio consisting of a piccolo player and triangle player—three times in the third act (which is set in Switzerland), to accompany a short and simple song which is sung by a little Savoyard (Alpine shepherd).

In 1915, the American composer Charles Ives included a chorus of diatonic accordions (or concertinas)—along with two pianos, celesta, harp, organ, zither and an optional theremin—in his Orchestral Set No. 2. The accordion part—written for the right-hand only—consists of eighteen measures at the very end of the eighteen-minute-long three-movement work. All the above works were written for the diatonic button accordion.

The first composer to write specifically for the chromatic accordion (able to play all 12 notes of the chromatic scale) was Paul Hindemith. In 1921 he included the harmonium in Kammermusik No. 1, a chamber work in four movements for twelve players, but later rewrote the harmonium part for accordion. Other German composers also wrote for the accordion.

In 1922, Austrian composer Alban Berg included a short on-stage accordion part in his landmark opera Wozzeck, Op. 7. The instrument—marked Ziehharmonika bzw. Akkordeon in the score appears only during the tavern garden (wirthausgarten) scene, along with an on-stage (Bühnenmusik) ensemble consisting of two fiddles (violins tuned up a tone), one clarinet in C, one guitar and one bombardon in F (or bass tuba), to lend a touch of authenticity to the deutsche Biergarten setting.

In the halls of academe, the American concert accordionist Robert Davine played a central role in establishing one of the few major academic courses of study in Accordion Performance within the United States during the late 1950s. As the founder and Dean of the University of Denver's Lamont School of Music's Department of Accordion, Davine influenced generations of students both in the United States and the People's Republic of China where he taught Master Classes. In addition to composing a Divertimento for Flute, Clarinet and Accordion , Davine is credited with concertizing and recording extensively within a variety of classical orchestral ensembles including: symphonic orchestras, chamber orchestras as well as string quartets.

Notable composers who wrote for the accordion during the first half of the 20th century were:
 Virgil Thomson: Four Saints in Three Acts (1928)
 Sergei Prokofiev: Cantata for the 20th Anniversary of the October Revolution, op. 74 (1936)
 Paul Dessau: Mother Courage (1936) and Die Verurteilung des Lukullus (1949)
 Dmitri Shostakovich: Jazz Suite No. 2 (1938)
 Jean Françaix: Apocalypse According to St. John (1939)
 Darius Milhaud: Prelude and Postlude for "Lidoire" (1946)
 Henry Brant: All Soul's Carnival (1949)
 George Antheil—of Ballet mécanique fame: Accordion Dance for accordion and orchestra (1951)
 John Serry, Sr.: American Rhapsody (1955), to name a few.

In 1937 the first accordion concerto was written and played in Russia.

Pauline Oliveros brought the accordion into the American experimental tradition.

Free-bass accordion in classical music 

Despite efforts by accordion performers and organizations to present the accordion as a serious instrument to the classical music world, the much-coveted breakthrough into the mainstream of serious musical circles did not take place until after leading accordionists more or less abandoned the stradella-bass accordion (an instrument limited to only bass and pre-set chord buttons on the left-hand manual) and embraced the free-bass accordion (an instrument which could play single pitches on the left-hand manual with a range of three octaves or more, similar to the right-hand manual). Composers found the free-bass accordion much more attractive and easier to write for as it liberated the instrument from a limited range of bass notes (only a major seventh, C to B) and the pre-set chord buttons.

Despite being invented as early as 1912, the instrument did not really become popular until the mid-20th century, when it was "discovered" by classical accordionists. The Danish accordionist Mogens Ellegaard, regarded by many as the father of the avant-garde accordion movement, described his introduction to the new accordion:

He said they heard shows with "Frosini, Deiro repertoire or folkloristic music." However, he found it was not possible to get a good education on accordion, as accordionists were not accepted at major music schools. The best soloists could hope for was playing at nightclubs on weekends.

Ellegaard continued,

Composer Ole Schmidt liked the instrument and in 1958 he composed a Symphonic Fantasy and Allegro, op. 20 for accordion and orchestra."

Symphonic Fantasy and Allegro was premiered by the Danish Radio Symphony with the composer conducting. Ole Schmidt made the following comment about the work, "I hated accordion until I met Mogens Ellegaard. He made me decide to write an accordion concerto for him."

Other Danish composers soon followed Schmidt:
 Niels Viggo Bentzon wrote Concerto for Accordion (1962–63), In the Zoo (1964) and Sinfonia concertante (1965) for six accordions, string orchestra and percussion.
 Per Nørgård wrote Anatomic Safari (1967) for solo accordion and Recall (1968) for accordion and orchestra, which was dedicated to Lars Dyremose, director of the Danish Accordion Academy.
 Karl Aage Rasmussen wrote Invention (1972)
 Hans Abrahamsen wrote Canzone (1977-8) for solo accordion.
  Steen Pade, Nørgård's student, wrote a concerto for accordion and three solo works: Excursions With Detours (1984), Aprilis (1987) and Cadenza (1987).
 Vagn Holmboe wrote Sonata, Op. 143A.

In Europe, free bass accordion performance has reached a very high level and the instrument is considered worthy of serious study in music conservatories. Modern and avant-garde composers such as Sofia Gubaidulina, Edison Denisov, Luciano Berio, Per Nørgård, Arne Nordheim, Jindrich Feld, Franco Donatoni, Toshio Hosokawa, Mauricio Kagel, Patrick Nunn and Magnus Lindberg have written for the free bass accordion and the instrument is becoming more frequently integrated into new music chamber and improvisation groups.

The Italian composer Salvatore Sciarrino (b. 1947) recently wrote a piece entitled Storie di Altre Storie, for accordionist Teodoro Anzellotti, requiring use of the free bass accordion in its instrumentation, and drawing off the keyboard sonatas of Domenico Scarlatti, the glass harmonica music of Wolfgang Amadeus Mozart, and the ballades of Guillaume de Machaut. It was well received by most European audiences and was released on a compilation disc of Sciarrino's other works on the Winter and Winter label. Young generation composers who have written for accordion include Christina Athinodorou (b. 1981) who wrote "Virgules" for Solo Accordion (2009) featuring the combined use between the stradella bass and the chromatic button system.

In the United States, the free-bass accordion is heard occasionally. Beginning in the 1960s, competitive performance on the accordion of classical piano compositions, by the great masters of music, occurred. Although never mainstreamed in the larger musical scene, this convergence with traditional classical music propelled young accordionists to an ultimate involvement with classical music heretofore not experienced.

A number of American instrumentalists did succeed in demonstrating the unique orchestral capabilities of the free bass accordion while performing at the nation's premier concert venues. In the process they encouraged contemporary composers to write for the instrument. Included among the leading orchestral artists was John Serry, Sr. A concert accordionist, soloist, composer, and arranger, Serry performed extensively in both symphonic orchestras and jazz ensembles as well as on live radio and television broadcasts. His refined poetic artistry gained respect for the free bass accordion as a serious concert instrument among prominent classical musicians and conductors of the early 20th century. In addition, his Concerto For Free Bass Accordion was completed in 1966 and illustrates the vast orchestral potentialities of the instrument.

Recently Guy Klucevsek has built a reputation on combining folk styles with classical forms and makes extensive use of the free bass. New York's William Schimmel, who composes and performs in many genres, is a leading exponent of the "quint" style free bass system and uses it extensively in tandem with the standard stradella system. Nick Ariondo, Los Angeles based accordionist/composer, has created a large repertoire for both free bass and standard stradella systems, performing throughout his career with vocalists, in solo recitals, chamber music settings and with orchestra. Opposite the Titano Accordion "quint" free bass system designed by Willard Palmer, Ariondo and the late Tommy Gumina are two artists in the United States that play a reverse "quint" free bass system (no converter, only free bass). Ariondo's "Perpetual Motion" (Paganini) video demonstrates the artistic capabilities of the free bass accordion .

In Canada several performers also contributed extensively to the acceptance of the Free Bass Accordion as a respected member of orchestral ensembles throughout North America. Among the leading performers, educators and composers is Joseph Macerollo who  has achieved widespread acclaim as an interpreter of both contemporary and classical compositions for the instrument.

Notes

References

Music Genres
Instrumental music